Antoinette Jennings (born May 17, 1949) is an American politician who was the 16th lieutenant governor of Florida. She was nominated to the office by Governor Jeb Bush in February 2003 to replace Frank Brogan, who resigned to become president of Florida Atlantic University. She was sworn in on March 3, 2003, becoming the first woman to hold the office.  She declined to run for governor in 2006 even though she was reputed to be Bush's preferred choice as his successor.

After the 2006 elections, Jennings was replaced as lieutenant governor by Jeff Kottkamp, on January 2, 2007.

Jennings previously served in the Florida House of Representatives from 1976–1980, and in the Florida Senate, from 1980–2000. In 1994, when Orange County chairman Linda Chapin announced she was not seeking re-election, she failed to convince Jennings to return to Orlando and campaign for the office herself.  Instead, she remained in Tallahassee to be elected by her Senate peers to be president of the Florida senate—the only person to have held the powerful office for two terms, from 1996–2000. In 2000, legislative term limits came into effect, having been instituted by a constitutional referendum taken several years earlier. Jennings was thereafter prohibited from seeking reelection.

Before entering public service, Jennings was an elementary school teacher. During and after her tenure in the legislature, she also ran the family construction business. She is a graduate of Wesleyan College.

As lieutenant governor, she worked on legislative relations for Bush, on education policy, hurricane preparedness, disaster relief and issues related to the Space Coast in Florida.

She joined FPL's board of directors a month after leaving office in 2007.

Jennings endorsed former Massachusetts Governor Mitt Romney in the 2008 presidential primary election.

See also 
 List of female lieutenant governors in the United States

References

External links 
 Biography at the Florida Women's Hall of Fame

1949 births
Living people
Lieutenant Governors of Florida
Presidents of the Florida Senate
Republican Party Florida state senators
Republican Party members of the Florida House of Representatives
People from Orlando, Florida
Wesleyan College alumni
Women in Florida politics
21st-century American women